Antonio Vázquez de Aldana Fernández (9 October 1860 – after 1920) was a Spanish sport shooter who competed in the 1920 Summer Olympics.

In the 1920 Summer Olympics he participated in the following events:

 Team 30 metre military pistol - sixth place
 Team 50 metre free pistol - twelfth place

References

External links
List of Spanish shooters

1860 births
Year of death missing
Spanish male sport shooters
ISSF pistol shooters
Olympic shooters of Spain
Shooters at the 1920 Summer Olympics
Sportspeople from Madrid
20th-century Spanish people